Batsaikhany Ariunbold  (born on 3 April 1990) is a Mongolian footballer who plays as a goalkeeper for Mongolian Premier League club Erchim and the Mongolian national team.

Career statistics

International

Statistics accurate as of match played 9 November 2016

References

1990 births
Living people
Mongolian footballers
Association football goalkeepers
Mongolia international footballers
Erchim players
Mongolian National Premier League players